Bjørne Jorgensen (December 16, 1893 – June 22, 1934) was an American gymnast. He competed in the men's artistic individual all-around event at the 1920 Summer Olympics.

References

1893 births
1934 deaths
American male artistic gymnasts
Olympic gymnasts of the United States
Gymnasts at the 1920 Summer Olympics
People from Asker
20th-century American people